Čubrilović is a Serbian surname, a patronymic derived from the name Čubrilo. It may refer to:

Veljko Čubrilović (1895–1915), Bosnian Serb revolutionary involved in the assassination of Austrian Archduke Franz Ferdinand
Vaso Čubrilović (1897–1990), Serbian scholar and Yugoslav politician. Veljko's brother, also participated in the assassination
 (1894–1962), Yugoslav politician
Nedeljko Čubrilović (born 1953), Bosnian Serb politician
Nik Cubrilovic, Australian hacker and internet security expert
Sava Čubrilović (d. 1969), Serbian émigrée, editor of Srpska borba, murdered by the UDBA

See also
Čubrić, surname

Serbian surnames